Lee Sa-bi (born Lee Eon-jeong on July 3, 1977) is a South Korean model and actress. She began her modelling career as a runway model in Daegu in 1998. Lee was the first native Korean to become a Playboy model. Her nude photo shoot was published in February 2004, and broadcast by South Korea's three largest telecommunication carriers to 16 mobile and internet services. Lee has since appeared in minor roles on TV and film since her acting debut in 2009 Lost Memories (2002). She also released a yoga exercise video in 2006.

Filmography

Television drama
 Family Secrets (tvN, 2014) - Kim Mi-yeon
 A Touch of Purity (KBS2, 2013) - Se-young
 Love Again (jTBC, 2012)
 IRIS (KBS2, 2009) - Tae-young
 Empress Cheonchu (KBS2, 2009) - Hyeolmae
 Urban Legends Deja Vu season 1 (Super Action, 2007) - Shin So-ra (guest appearance, ep 4)
 One Fine Day (SBS, 2006) - Choi Sun-kyung
 My Girl (SBS, 2005-2006) - Yoon Jin-kyung
 Hello Franceska (MBC, 2005) - Victoria (guest appearance)
 The Land (SBS, 2004-2005) - Jang-yi
 You are a Star (KBS1, 2004-2005) - Young-ran

Film
 Hot Service: A Cruel Hairdresser (2015) - Nan-ja
 Man on High Heels (2014) - Joo-yeon
 A Touch of Unseen (2014) - Yeon-soo
 The Fatal Encounter (2014) - gisaeng at gibang 1
 Way Back Home (2013) - KBC TV writer
 Hindsight (2011) - coffee shop clerk
 IRIS: The Movie (2010) - Tae-young
 Our School's E.T. (2008) - chemistry teacher
 She's on Duty (2005)
 Doll Master (2004)
 Hypnotized (2004) 
 2009 Lost Memories (2002)

Variety show
 Studio Pink (OnStyle, 2007-2008)

Music video
 Sung Si-kyung - "사랑하는 일 (To Love)" (2008)
 Epik High - "Fly" (2005)

Theater
 Thief's Diary (2009)

References

External links
 
 
 Lee Eon-jung at Double M Entertainment
 
 

1977 births
Living people
South Korean female models
South Korean film actresses
South Korean television actresses
People from Yeongcheon